= Hurungamuwagama =

Populated place in Sri Lanka

Coordinates: 07°57′54″N 080°18′37″E

Hurungamuwagama (also known as Hurruggomuwagama) is a populated place in the North Western Province of Sri Lanka.
